Edward William Auriol Drummond-Hay (4 April 1785 – February 1845) was a British soldier, antiquarian and diplomat.

Drummond-Hay was the son of Edward Hay-Drummond and Elizabeth de Vismes, and the grandson of Archbishop Robert Hay Drummond. He was educated at Christ Church, Oxford, graduating in 1806.

He 1808 he received a commission in the British Army and served with the 61st Regiment of Foot and 73rd (Perthshire) Regiment of Foot during the Napoleonic Wars. He fought in the Peninsular War and was present at the Battle of Waterloo in 1815.

On leaving the army, Drummond-Hay pursued his interest in antiquities and history, including undertaking a translation of Frederika Freygang and Wilhelm von Freygang's Letters from the Caucasus and Georgia. In August 1823 he moved to Edinburgh upon being appointed Lyon Clerk and Keeper of the Records, the role having been secured through the influence of his cousin, Thomas Hay-Drummond, 11th Earl of Kinnoull. On 8 March 1824, he joined the Society of Antiquaries of Scotland and was its Secretary between 1827 and 1829. 

In 1829, Drummond-Hay was appointed Consul-General to Morocco and relocated to Tangiers. His private journals of his journey to Morocco, held by the Bodleian Library, cover the period from 1829 to 1830. His remit from the Foreign Office was to counter French expansionism in the region (particularly after the French conquest of Algeria in 1830) and to protect British shipping. He died in Morocco in 1845.

Drummond-Hay married Louisa Margaret Thomson on 14 December 1812. Together they had ten children, including Sir Edward Drummond-Hay and Sir John Hay Drummond Hay.

References

1785 births
1845 deaths
61st Regiment of Foot officers
73rd Regiment of Foot officers
Alumni of Christ Church, Oxford
Ambassadors of the United Kingdom to Morocco
British Army personnel of the Napoleonic Wars
British travel writers
Fellows of the Society of Antiquaries of Scotland
Scottish officers of arms